Anansi the Spider may refer to:
Anansi, a trickster in the folk tales of the Ashanti people of Ghana
Anansi (Static Shock), a hero in the cartoon series Static Shock
Anansi the Spider (book), a children's picture book by Gerald McDermott, published in 1972